The Nova Awards are presented annually at the UK science fiction convention Novacon and recognise achievement in British and Irish sf fanzines.

When initiated in 1973, a panel of sf fans named the best fanzine that year. Subsequently, voting has been opened up to all members of the convention able to demonstrate a basic familiarity with the field; in addition, Novas were also presented to the best fanzine writer and best fanzine artist. In 2011, the poll was opened up to all British and Irish sf fans able to meet the 'familiarity' criterion.

Past administrators have included Dave Langford, Pam Wells, Paul Vincent, Martin Tudor, Sandra Bond and Tony Berry. In 2009, Steve Green stepped down after seven years in post, and Tudor resumed the reins; unfortunately, Tudor was unable to see the year out and Green returned to run the 2010 Novas.

Following a debate at Novacon 39 and follow-up discussions at Novacon 40, the rules were changed in 2011 to allow voting by non-Novacon members resident in the UK and Eire.

In March 2015, Novacon 45 announced the main categories were being retired, although occasional 'committee awards' might still be made.

Past winners
1973: Speculation #32, ed. Peter Weston
1974: Zimri #6, ed. Lisa Conesa; Big Scab #2, ed. John Brosnan (draw)
1975: Maya #8, ed. Rob Jackson
1976: Maya, ed. Rob Jackson
1977: Twll-Ddu, ed. Dave Langford
1978: Gross Encounters, ed. Alan Dorey
1979: Seamonsters, ed. Simone Walsh
1980: One-Off, ed. Dave Bridges
1981: Tappen, ed. Malcolm Edwards (best fanzine); Chris Atkinson (best fanzine writer); Pete Lyon (best fanzine artist)
1982: Epsilon, ed. Rob Hansen; Chris Atkinson; Rob Hansen
1983: A Cool Head, ed. Dave Bridges; Dave Bridges; Margaret Welbank
1984: Xyster, ed. Dave Wood; Anne Hammill; D West
1985: Prevert, ed. John Jarrold; Abi Frost; Ros Calverly
1986: Pink Fluffy Bedsocks, ed. Owen Whiteoak; Owen Whiteoak; Arthur Thomson (ATom)
1987: Lip, ed. Hazel Ashworth; D West; D West
1988: Lip, ed. Hazel Ashworth; Michael Ashley; D West
1989: VSOP, ed. Jan Orys; Simon Polley; Dave Mooring
1990: Fuck the Tories, ed. Joseph Nicholas, Judith Hanna; Dave Langford; Dave Mooring
1991: Saliromania, ed. Michael Ashley; Michael Ashley; D West
1992: Bob?, ed. Ian Sorensen; Michael Ashley; Dave Mooring
1993: Lagoon, ed. Simon Ounsley; Simon Ounsley; Dave Mooring
1994: Rastus Johnson’s Cakewalk, ed. Greg Pickersgill; Greg Pickersgill; D West
1995: Attitude, ed. Michael Abbott, John Dallman, Pam Wells; Simon Ounsley; D West
1996: Banana Wings, ed. Claire Brialey, Mark Plummer; Alison Freebairn; D West
1997: Banana Wings, ed. Claire Brialey, Mark Plummer; Mark Plummer; Sue Mason
1998: Banana Wings, ed. Claire Brialey, Mark Plummer; Maureen Kincaid Speller; D West
1999: Barmaid, ed. Yvonne Rowse; Yvonne Rowse; Sue Mason
2000: Plokta, ed. Alison Scott, Steve Davies, Mike Scott; Yvonne Rowse; Sue Mason
2001: Head, ed. Doug Bell, Christina Lake; Alison Freebairn; Dave Hicks
2002: Plokta, ed. Alison Scott, Steve Davies, Mike Scott; Claire Brialey; Dave Hicks
2003: Zoo Nation, ed. Pete Young; Claire Brialey; Sue Mason
2004: Zoo Nation, ed. Pete Young; Claire Brialey; Sue Mason
2005: Banana Wings, ed. Claire Brialey, Mark Plummer; Claire Brialey; Alison Scott
2006: Banana Wings, ed. Claire Brialey, Mark Plummer; Claire Brialey; Sue Mason
2007: Prolapse, ed. Peter Weston; Mark Plummer; Alison Scott
2008: Prolapse, ed. Peter Weston; Claire Brialey; Alison Scott
2009: Banana Wings, eds. Claire Brialey, Mark Plummer; Claire Brialey; Sue Mason
2010: Journey Planet, eds. Christopher J Garcia, James Bacon, Claire Brialey; Mark Plummer; Arthur "ATom" Thomson (the first Nova Award ever won posthumously).
2011: Head, ed. Doug Bell, Christina Lake; Claire Brialey; Dave Hicks
2012: Banana Wings, eds. Claire Brialey, Mark Plummer; Mark Plummer (fanwriter); Sue Mason and D. West were tied (fanartist)
2013: Banana Wings, eds. Claire Brialey, Mark Plummer; Mike Meara (fanwriter); D. West (fanartist)
2014: Vibrator, ed. Graham Charnock; Christina Lake (fanwriter); D. West (fanartist)

External links 
 Nova Awards Homepage

Awards established in 1973
British speculative fiction awards